Yelena Yatsura (Russian: Елена Яцура) is an independent Russian film producer.

Career
Yatsura has collaborated with “Slovo”, “Non-Stop Production”, “Bogwood Kino” and “Filmocom” film companies.

She has produced debut films by various directors, including Philipp Yankovsky (In Motion, 2002) and Fedor Bondarchuk (The 9th Company, 2005); prize winners of international film festivals – Alexey German-jr. (The Last Train, 2003) and Ilya Khrzhanovsky (4,2004); and symbolic representatives of Russian artistic circle Konstantin Murzenko (April, 2001) and Renata Litvinova (The Goddess: How I Fell In Love, 2004).

In 2008 Sergei Dvortsevoy with Tulpan, an ethnic film about Kazakh nomads that received international awards including "Un Certain Regard Award" in Cannes and outstanding reviews

Awards
She won the Best Producer of the CIS and Baltic Countries award at the Open Film Festival Kinoshok in 2003. She is a two-time winner of the “Nika” Russian National Film Award as the Best Fiction Film Producer (“Our Own”, 2004 and The 9th Company, 2005) and the winner of the “Golden Eagle” National Film Award as the Best Fiction Film Producer of 2005 (“9th Company”).

Films
To Love Like Russians Do - 2 (1996, directed by Evgeniy Matveyev)
American Bet (1997, directed by Dmitry Meskhiev)
Tests For Real Men (1998, directed by Andrey Razenkov)
Women's Property (1999, directed by Dmitry Meskhiev)
To Love Like Russians Do -3. The Governor (1999, directed by Evgeniy Matveyev)
April (2001, directed by Konstantin Murzenko)
The Sky. The Plane. The Girl. (2002, directed by Vera Storozheva)
In Motion (2002, directed by Filipp Yankovsky)
Black Ice (2002, directed by Mikhail Brashinskiy)
Diary Of A Kamikaze (2002, directed by Dmitry Meskhiev
The Last Train (2003, directed by Alexey German-jr.)
Honey Baby (2004, directed by Mika Kaurismyaki)
Our Own (2004, directed by Dmitry Meskhiev)
Goddess. How I Fell In Love (2004, directed by Renata Litvinova)
4 (2004, directed by Ilya Khrzhanovskiy)
The Wonderful Valley  (2004, directed by Rano Kubayeva)
Russian Dolls (2005, directed by Cedrik Klapisch)
9th Company (2005, directed by Fedor Bondarchuk)
La Traductrice (2006, directed by Elena Khazanova)
9 months (2006, directed by Rezo Gigineishvili) 8-episodes TV-series
Red Pearl Of Love (2008, directed by Andres Puustusmaa)
Tulpan (2008, directed by Sergei Dvortsevoy)
The Concert (2009, directed by Radu Mikhaelianu)
Cadences (2010, directed by Ivan Savelyev)
Brothel Lights (2011, directed by Alexander Gordon)
Dumpling Brothers (2013, directed by Gennadiy Ostrovskiy)
Little Bird ('Ptichka') (2015, directed by Vladimir Beck)
 The Hit (2015, directed by Rita Mikhailova) – post-production

References

Further reading

External links

sinemalar.com
Yelena Yatsura and Olga Aylarova attend the Coproduction Market (Getty Image photo)

1968 births
Living people
People from Krasnodar
Russian film producers
Russian women film producers